Peyton James Aldridge (born November 10, 1995) is an American professional basketball player for Petkim Spor of the Turkish Basketball Super League (BSL). He played college basketball for Davidson.

High school career
Aldridge scored 1,735 points in his career at LaBrae High School, a school record. He was also a highly rated quarterback prospect in high school, though basketball remained his favorite sport. Davidson coach Bob McKillop offered him a scholarship after he broke his jaw in a tournament and played the next game anyway. Despite getting looks from the likes of Nick Saban, Aldridge opted not to play football as a senior to focus on basketball.

College career
He averaged 9.4 points and 5.1 rebounds in his freshman year at Davidson. With the graduation of Tyler Kalinoski, Aldridge had a more prominent role as a sophomore, averaging 15.5 points and a team-best 6.5 rebounds per game. As a junior, he was named to the Second team All-Atlantic 10. He averaged 20.5 points per game as a second option to Jack Gibbs.

Aldridge scored his 2,000th point in a Davidson uniform in a win against Fordham on February 21, 2018. Aldridge scored 45 points in a triple overtime loss to St. Bonaventure on February 28, and was named CBS Sports player of the week. As a senior, Aldridge averaged 21.3 points per game, leading Davidson to a third-place finish in the Atlantic 10. He was named conference co-Player of the Year with Jaylen Adams.

Professional career
After going undrafted in the 2018 NBA Draft, Aldridge was later included in the 2018 NBA Summer League roster of the Utah Jazz. On July 22, 2018, Aldridge went to Italy and signed with Vanoli Cremona where he averaged 11.5 points in 29 games. The Memphis Grizzlies added Aldridge to their 2019 summer league roster.

On September 2, 2019, Aldridge signed with Afyon Belediye of the Turkish Basketball Super League. He averaged 11.0 points and 4.9 rebounds per game, shooting 44.2% from the 3-point arc.

On July 2, 2020, Aldridge signed with Bahçeşehir Koleji. He averaged 4.6 points and 2.6 rebounds per game.

On July 22, 2021, Aldridge signed with Petkim Spor of the Turkish Basketball Super League (BSL).

References

External links 
Davidson Wildcats bio

1995 births
Living people
Afyonkarahisar Belediyespor players
American expatriate basketball people in Italy
American men's basketball players
Bahçeşehir Koleji S.K. players
Basketball players from Ohio
Davidson Wildcats men's basketball players
Lega Basket Serie A players
People from Trumbull County, Ohio
Petkim Spor players
Power forwards (basketball)
Vanoli Cremona players